Wairau Valley is the valley of the Wairau River in Marlborough, New Zealand and also the name of the main settlement in the upper valley. State Highway 63 runs through the valley. The valley opens onto the Wairau Plain, where Renwick and Blenheim are sited. The Alpine–Wairau Fault runs along the length of the valley.

Wairauite is an iron-cobalt alloy which is named after the valley.

History and culture

European settlement

J. S. Cotterell surveyed the Wairau Valley in November 1842, and reported it contained rich land. Settlers from Nelson, led by Arthur Wakefield, tried to take possession of the land but the Ngāti Toa, led by Te Rauparaha and Te Rangihaeata objected. The dispute escalated into the Wairau Affray at Tuamarina on 23 June 1843, in which 22 settlers and four Māori were killed. An enquiry held in 1844 by Governor Robert FitzRoy decided that the settlers were in the wrong.

In November 1846, Nelson farmers Nathaniel Morse and John Cooper drove sheep into the Wairau valley and established settlements. Governor Sir George Grey purchased the land in the same year, but legal title to the land for the settlers was sorted out later.

In the 1855 Wairarapa earthquake, the eastern end of the Wairau valley subsided by over a metre.

Marae

Parerarua Marae is located in Wairau Valley. It is a marae (meeting ground) of Ngāti Rārua and includes the Parerarua wharenui (meeting house).

In October 2020, the Government committed $246,418 from the Provincial Growth Fund towards renovating the marae, creating an estimated 7 jobs.

Demographics
It is part of the wider Upper Wairau statistical area.

The town had a population of 231 at the 2018 New Zealand census, an increase of 21 people (10.0%) since the 2013 census, and an increase of 51 people (28.3%) since the 2006 census. There were 96 households. There were 108 males and 123 females, giving a sex ratio of 0.88 males per female. The median age was 47.4 years (compared with 37.4 years nationally), with 39 people (16.9%) aged under 15 years, 36 (15.6%) aged 15 to 29, 108 (46.8%) aged 30 to 64, and 48 (20.8%) aged 65 or older.

Ethnicities were 96.1% European/Pākehā, 6.5% Māori, 2.6% Pacific peoples, and 1.3% other ethnicities (totals add to more than 100% since people could identify with multiple ethnicities).

Although some people objected to giving their religion, 63.6% had no religion, 23.4% were Christian and 3.9% had other religions.

Of those at least 15 years old, 33 (17.2%) people had a bachelor or higher degree, and 42 (21.9%) people had no formal qualifications. The median income was $29,300, compared with $31,800 nationally. The employment status of those at least 15 was that 108 (56.2%) people were employed full-time, 33 (17.2%) were part-time, and 3 (1.6%) were unemployed.

Upper Wairau

Upper Wairau had a population of 1,938 at the 2018 New Zealand census, an increase of 192 people (11.0%) since the 2013 census, and an increase of 246 people (14.5%) since the 2006 census. There were 741 households. There were 999 males and 939 females, giving a sex ratio of 1.06 males per female. The median age was 46.3 years (compared with 37.4 years nationally), with 384 people (19.8%) aged under 15 years, 222 (11.5%) aged 15 to 29, 1,035 (53.4%) aged 30 to 64, and 300 (15.5%) aged 65 or older.

Ethnicities were 95.5% European/Pākehā, 6.3% Māori, 0.9% Pacific peoples, 0.9% Asian, and 1.9% other ethnicities (totals add to more than 100% since people could identify with multiple ethnicities).

The proportion of people born overseas was 16.9%, compared with 27.1% nationally.

Although some people objected to giving their religion, 56.8% had no religion, 32.8% were Christian, 0.5% were Buddhist and 2.0% had other religions.

Of those at least 15 years old, 339 (21.8%) people had a bachelor or higher degree, and 234 (15.1%) people had no formal qualifications. The median income was $40,300, compared with $31,800 nationally. The employment status of those at least 15 was that 918 (59.1%) people were employed full-time, 270 (17.4%) were part-time, and 12 (0.8%) were unemployed.

Education

Wairau Valley School is a coeducational full primary (years 1–8) school with a roll of  students as of  A school first opened in the Wairau valley in 1861.

References

Populated places in the Marlborough Region
Landforms of the Marlborough Region
Valleys of New Zealand